Moi is a human name, which has been used as both a surname and a given name.

Given name 
 Moi Avei (born 1946), Papua New Guinean politician
 Moi Gómez (born 1994), Spanish footballer
 Moi Torrallardona (born 1966), Spanish off-road rally truck co-driver and navigator
 Moi Ver (1904–1995), photographer and painter

Surname 
 Daniel arap Moi (1924–2020), President of Kenya from 1978 to 2002
 Gideon Moi (born 1964), Kenyan politician and youngest son of Daniel arap Moi
 Joey Moi, Canadian music producer
 Toril Moi (born 1953), Duke University professor

See also 
 Moy (surname)
 Moye (name)